Harry Mark Hall (born 19 November 1970) is a former English cricketer.  Hall was a right-handed batsman who bowled slow left-arm orthodox.  He was born at Wokingham, Berkshire.

Hall made his debut for Berkshire in the 1994 Minor Counties Championship against Cornwall.  From 1994 to 2000, he represented the county in 10 Minor Counties Championships matches, with his final appearance for the county in that competition coming against Cornwall.  He also represented Berkshire in 10 MCCA Knockout Trophy matches from 1993 to 2000.

Hall also represented Berkshire in List-A cricket, with his debut List-A game coming against Leicestershire in the 1996 NatWest Trophy.  He represented the county in 5 further List-A matches, with his final List-A appearance for the county coming against Durham in 2000 NatWest Trophy.  In his 6 matches, he scored 189 runs at a batting average of 31.50 and a single century high score of 108.

Family
His brother Thomas also represented Berkshire in Minor Counties and List-A cricket.

References

External links
Harry Hall at Cricinfo
Harry Hall at CricketArchive

1970 births
Living people
People from Wokingham
English cricketers
Berkshire cricketers